Ailinzebina is a small genus of minute sea snails, marine gastropod mollusks or micromollusks, in the family Rissoinidae.

Species
 Ailinzebina abrardi (Ladd, 1966)
 Ailinzebina elegantissima (d'Orbigny, 1842)
 Ailinzebina laticostata Faber, 2013
 Ailinzebina onobiformis (Rolán & Luque, 2000)
 Ailinzebina sleursi Faber, 2013

References

 Faber M.J. (2013) Ten new species of Rissoinidae from the Central Indo-Pacific (Gastropoda: Rissooidea). Miscellanea Malacologica 6(2): 15‒34

Rissoinidae